Bullhead Lake is a lake in South Dakota, in the United States.

Bullhead Lake was a natural habitat for bullhead fish, hence the name.

See also
List of lakes in South Dakota

References

Lakes of South Dakota
Lakes of Roberts County, South Dakota